Venanus is a genus of braconid wasps in the family Braconidae. There are about 11 described species in Venanus, found in the New World.

Species
These 11 species belong to the genus Venanus:
 Venanus chilensis Mason, 1981
 Venanus greeneyi Whitfield & Arias-Penna, 2011
 Venanus heberti Fernández-Triana, 2010
 Venanus helavai Mason, 1981
 Venanus johnnyrosalesi Fernández-Triana & Whitfield, 2014
 Venanus kusikuyllurae Rasmussen & Whitfield, 2011
 Venanus minutalis (Muesebeck, 1958)
 Venanus peruensis Mason, 1981
 Venanus pinicola Mason, 1981
 Venanus randallgarciai Fernández-Triana & Whitfield, 2014
 Venanus yanayacuensis Arias-Penna & Whitfield, 2011

References

Further reading

 
 
 

Microgastrinae